The 2005 Pan American Cycling Championships took place at the Julio Polet Velodrome, Mar del Plata, Argentina April 25, May 1, 2005.

Medal summary

Road

Men

Women

Under 23 Men

Track

Men

Women

References

Americas
Americas
Cycling
Pan American Road and Track Championships
International cycle races hosted by Argentina